International Correspondence Chess Federation (ICCF) was founded on 26 March 1951 as a new appearance of the International Correspondence Chess Association (ICCA), which was founded in 1945, as successor of the Internationaler Fernschachbund (IFSB), founded on 2 December 1928.
 
The current chairman is Eric Ruch.

History

Before ICCF 
Some sources say that correspondence chess was already played in the 12th century. Most chess historians doubt whether this is true. In the 19th century chess clubs and magazines started to organize more regular tournaments, national as well as international tournaments. Finally in 1928 the first international league (Internationaler Fernschachbund) was founded. Alexander Alekhine, Paul Keres and Max Euwe were well-known enthusiastic correspondence chess players during some periods of their chess careers.

ICSB
On 15 August 1928, the ICSB (Internationaler Correspondensschachbund/International Correspondence Chess Federation) was created under the leadership of Erich Otto Freienhagen (Berlin), which had existed in a loose form since November 1927.  Other members of the management were J.Keemink (Netherlands), K.Laue, H. von Massow, H.Schild (Germany) and C.Olsen (Norway).  This was the first successful attempt to create an international correspondence chess federation.  It survived for only a short period, but its successor proved to be viable and successful.

IFSB
On 2 December 1928, a new federation was formed in Berlin.  To distinguish it from its predecessor, it was named the IFSB (Internationaler Fernschachbund).  The founders were: R.Dührssen (President), J.Keemink (Vice-President), H. von Massow (Secretary), K.Laue (Teasurer) and L.Probst (Managing Editor).

Freienhagen (and others from ICSB) continue in parallel with the IFSB.  Freienhagen died in 1933.

After this, correspondence chess players started joining IFSB.  At that time, there was only individual membership and only later did it become possible for countries to be members.

IFSB Champions: Eduard Dyckhoff and Eugen Busch (Germany), 1929; E.Dyckhoff, 1930; A.H.Priwonitz (Germany), 1931; Hans Müller (Austria), 1932; Marcel Duchamp (France), 1933; Hilding Persson (Sweden), 1934; Paul Keres (Estonia), 1935; Milan Vidmar (Yugoslavia), 1936; Miklos Szigeti (Hungary), 1937 and Edmund Adam (Germany), 1938.

IFSB European Olympiad: the Hungarian Team (Balogh, Nagy, Szigeti, Barcza, Boros and Szucz) won the Final (1937-1939).

When the Second World War began, the IFSB Board decided to discontinue its activity.

The top officials during the history of the IFSB here:

1928-1934: R.Dührssen (President) - J.Keemink (Vice-President)

1934-1935:  K.Schjorring (President) - I. Abonyi (Vice-President)

1935-1939:  I.Abonyi (President) - H.W. von Massow (General Secretary)

Current membership 
ICCF, the present successor of the IFSB, is a federation of national member organizations. At this moment there are worldwide 56 ICCF national member federations with altogether more than 100,000 individual member correspondence chess players. Most of them are playing several games simultaneously. Some of them are even playing more than 100 games at the same time. Most strong players think that 15 email games at the same time is the upper limit.

Presidents 
  Jean-Louis Ormond (1951–1955)
   Anders Elgesem (1955–1959)
   Hans Werner von Massow (1959–1987)
   Hendrik Mostert (1988–1996)
   Alan Borwell (1997–2003)
   Josef Mrkvicka (2003–2004)
   Max Zavanelli (2005, acting)
   Mohamed Samraoui (2005–2009)
   Eric Ruch (2009–....)

Tournaments 
Using its own language-independent chess notation, ICCF organizes all kind of tournaments: individual and team championships, title norm tournaments and promotion tournaments (from Open Class until Master Class) – in postal, email and the ICCF correspondence server versions. Starting from 2011 ICCF organizes chess960 events.

Almost the same kind of tournaments also exists within the three zones into which ICCF is divided: Europe, America/Pacific and Africa/Asia.

Zone 1; Europe	 Director : Pavlikov, Andrey (RUS)

Zone 2-3; America/Pacific Director : Bokar, Dr. Jason (USA)

Zone 4; Africa/Asia Director : Knol, Everdinand (RSA)

ICCF is closely co-operating with the leading world chess organization FIDE. All ICCF titles, championships and ratings are recognised by FIDE.

Titles 
The correspondence chess title International Correspondence Chess Grandmaster is a title that is rewarded by ICCF.

ICCF correspondence chess titles:
 GM:  Correspondence Chess Grandmaster (minimum rating 2600)
 SIM: Correspondence Chess Senior International Master (minimum rating 2525)
 IM:  Correspondence Chess International Master (minimum rating 2450)
 CCM: Correspondence Chess Master (minimum rating 2300)
 CCE: Correspondence Chess Expert (minimum rating 2150)
Legacy titles:
 LGM: Lady Grandmaster (equivalent to CCM)
 LIM: Lady International Master (equivalent to CCE)

See also 
 FIDE—Fédération Internationale des Échecs
 FIDE titles
 Chess title
 ICCF national member federations—Short articles about the federations
 ICCF numeric notation
 World Correspondence Chess Championship
 Correspondence Chess Olympiad

References

External links 

 

Correspondence chess organizations
Sports organizations established in 1951
1951 in chess